Yu Kau Wai (born 23 March 1965) is a Hong Kong former cyclist. He competed in the team time trial at the 1988 Summer Olympics.

References

External links
 

1965 births
Living people
Hong Kong male cyclists
Olympic cyclists of Hong Kong
Cyclists at the 1988 Summer Olympics
Place of birth missing (living people)